The 24th Luna Awards were held on September 16, 2006 at PAGCOR Grand Theater and they honored the best Filipino films of the year 2005. This is the last extravagant awards ceremony that was held by the Academy. After this, the Academy started holding simple ceremonies due to lack of government funding.

The nominees were announced on August 11, 2006. Nasaan Ka Man received the most nominations with ten. Blue Moon followed with nine.

Both Blue Moon and Nasaan Ka Man won most of the awards with four awards. The former also received Best Picture. It was delayed telecast on RPN, the last telecast ever of the Luna Awards.

Winners and nominees

Special awards

Multiple nominations and awards

References

External links
 Official Website of the Film Academy of the Philippines

Luna Awards
2005 film awards
2006 in Philippine cinema